The Record Company is a Grammy-nominated American rock band from Los Angeles. The members are Chris Vos (guitar, lead vocals), Alex Stiff (bass, backing vocals), and Marc Cazorla (drums, backing vocals).  Their music is influenced by blues musicians like John Lee Hooker, early punk bands like The Stooges, and rock bands like The Rolling Stones.

The trio started in late 2011, recording live in the bass player's living room in Los Feliz, California. The Record Company have since played concert halls across North America, opening for John Mayer, B.B. King, Social Distortion, Buddy Guy, Bob Seger, Grace Potter, and Trombone Shorty. The band toured Europe supporting Blackberry Smoke in late 2015.

The band has received positive reviews from Entertainment Weekly, Paste, The Huffington Post, and Rolling Stone.  Rolling Stone also included The Record Company in their April 2016 list of "10 New Artists You Need to Know."

History

Prior to forming The Record Company, band members Stiff and Cazorla played together in the indie-rock band The Frequency.

Give It Back to You (2016–2017)

Their first full-length album Give It Back to You was released on Concord Records on February 12, 2016. The album was written, recorded, and mixed by the band in the same living room in the Los Feliz neighborhood of Los Angeles where The Record Company formed and did their first recordings. The lead single, "Off the Ground", reached #1 on the US Billboard Adult Alternative Songs chart. The album's second single, “Rita Mae Young,” reached No. 12 on the Adult Alternative Songs chart.
The album spent 42 weeks on both the Billboard Heatseekers Albums Chart and the Nielsen Alternative New Artist Chart and was nominated for a Grammy Award in the category of Best Contemporary Blues Album.  Give It Back to You was nominated for Best Contemporary Blues Album in the 2017 Grammy Awards, losing to The Last Days of Oakland by Fantastic Negrito.

To promote Give It Back to You, the band appeared on CBS’ Late Show with Stephen Colbert, CBS This Morning and TBS’ Conan, as well as SiriusXM, NPR’s World Café Live, and Chicago, IL’s WXRT.  The band were also favorites at the Bonnaroo Music & Arts Festival, prompting Rolling Stone Country to name the trio’s set among the event’s “5 Best Country and Americana Moments” while declaring it “a wildly energetic show and one of the most communal experiences of the festival.” The Record Company embarked on their first headline tour in the fall of 2016 in support of Give It Back to You, selling out 32 of the 41 shows they played. That was followed by a tour opening for John Mayer in early 2017. The band then toured Australia and Europe and made festival appearances.

All of this Life (2017–present)

In the spring of 2017, they followed up with “Baby, I’m Broken,” which reached No. 6 on the Adult Alternative Songs chart. The song did not appear on any album.

In April 2018, the band released "Life to Fix", the lead single off their second studio album, All of This Life. The song was praised by NPR and Rolling Stone.

In June 2021 the band released an EP, entitled Side Project, which featured covers of songs by Willie Dixon, INXS, and Cypress Hill. Later that year, in October they released a new album, Play Loud.

Band members
Chris Vos – vocals, guitars, lap steel, pedal steel, harmonica
Alex Stiff – bass, guitars, piano, vocals
Marc Cazorla – drums, piano, vocals

Discography

Studio albums

Singles

Vinyl singles and EPs
 "Don't Let Me Get Lonely"/"Born Unnamed" vinyl 7" single self-released March 2012
 "This Crooked City"/"Tallahassee Lassie" vinyl 7" single released May 2012 by Turntable Kitchen
 Superdead EP – released July 17, 2012
 Covers EP – released November 28, 2012
 Feels So Good EP – released November 19, 2013
 Feels So Good EP Vinyl Edition (Kill/Hurt Records). Limited edition 180-gram gold vinyl featuring 3 unreleased extended length tracks, released March 24, 2014

Appearances in media
 Their cover of The O'Jays' "Love Train" was featured in a 2012 Coors Light commercial
 "Feels So Good" was featured in USA's Suits in S3E05 (August 13, 2013)
 "Ain't Love Warm" was featured in USA's Suits in S3E05 (August 13, 2013) and S3E10 (September 17, 2013)
 "Feels So Good" featured in the theatrical trailer for Last Vegas (2013)
 "Baby I'm Broken" was featured in CBS's CSI: Crime Scene Investigation in Season 14, Episode 15: "Love for Sale" (February 19, 2014)
 "Rita Mae Young" featured in the BBC America show Orphan Black S2E04 - "Governed as It Were by Chance" (May 10, 2014)
 "Off the Ground" appears in a Miller Lite commercial, March 2015
 "Don't Let Me Get Lonely", "Feels So Good", and "In the Mood for You" featured in Showtime's Shameless
 "I Want Change" featured in ABC's Nashville
"In the Mood for You" was used in the 2016 film Bad Moms.
 On March 7, 2016, The Record Company appeared on Conan, performing "Off the Ground" from their album Give It Back to You.
 In 2016 "Turn Me Loose" was featured at the end of the show during credits of the Netflix television series Bloodline Season 2 Episode 7.
 On May 20, 2017, The Record Company appeared on CBS This Morning, performing "Off the Ground" and "Baby I'm Broken" from their album Give It Back to You.
 "Off the Ground" is heard in Season 1 Episode 2 of CBS's Seal Team, October 2017.
"Hard Day Coming Down" and "Never Gonna Cry For Me" appeared in the 2017 film Live or Die in La Honda.
"How High" appears on the MLB The Show 22 soundtrack
 "Life To Fix" is heard in "The ROOKIE" Season 1 - Episode 20 of ABC's Free Fall, 6 April 2019.

References

External links
 

Musical groups from Los Angeles
American musical trios
Musical groups established in 2011
2011 establishments in California